Oscar Kramer (25 May 1935 – 7 April 2010) was an Argentine film producer. He was born in Buenos Aires. He worked in the cinema of Argentina when he was young. In the 1970s he lived in Antwerp, Belgium, where he worked in the diamond industry. After a few decades, in the 1980s he returned to Argentina with his wife and son to direct films.

Filmography
 Eversmile, New Jersey (1989)
 Alambrado (1991) a.k.a. Barbed Wire
 La Peste (1992) a.k.a. The Plague
 De eso no se habla (1993) a.k.a. I Don't Want to Talk About It
 Corazón iluminado (1996) a.k.a. Foolish Heart
 The Tango Lesson (1997)
 El Impostor (1997) a.k.a. The Impostor
 Plata quemada (2000) a.k.a. Burnt Money
 Kamchatka (2002)
 El Último tren (2002) a.k.a. The Last Train
 Carandiru (2003)
 El Perro (2004) a.k.a. Bombón: El Perro
 Tiempo de valientes (2005)
 El Camino de San Diego (2006) a.k.a. The Road to San Diego
 Crónica de una fuga (2006) a.k.a. Chronicle of an Escape
 El Pasado (2007) a.k.a. The Past
 Los Marziano (2011)

References

External links
 
 

Argentine film producers
1935 births
2010 deaths